The Waynesboro Area School District is a midsized, suburban public school district located in Franklin County, Pennsylvania. The district is one of the 500 public school districts of Pennsylvania. It encompasses the boroughs of Waynesboro and Mont Alto, as well as all of Washington Township and Quincy Township, and a portion of Guilford Township. According to 2000 federal census data, it serves a resident population of 28,376. By 2010, the district's population increased to 32,386 people. In 2009, the district residents' per capita income was $18,503, while the median family income was $46,584. In the Commonwealth, the median family income was $49,501 and the United States median family income was $49,445, in 2010.

The district operates four elementary schools: Fairview Avenue Elementary School, Hooverville Elementary School, Mowery Elementary School, and Summitview Elementary School. It also operates: Waynesboro Area Middle School, and Waynesboro Area Senior High School. High school students may choose to attend Franklin County Career and Technology Center for training in the construction and mechanical trades.

Waynesboro Area School District is served by the Lincoln Intermediate Unit IU12 which offers a variety of services, including assistance in developing K–12 curriculum that is mapped and aligned with the Pennsylvania Academic Standards, shared services, a group purchasing program and a wide variety of special education and special needs services. Students may choose to attend Franklin Virtual Academy which is an online education program operated by a cooperative agreement of local Franklin County public school districts.

Sports 
The district funds:

Boys
Baseball - AAAA
Basketball- AAAA
Cross country - AAA
Football - AAAA
Golf - AAA
Soccer - AAA
Track and field - AAA
Wrestling - AAA

Girls
Basketball - AAAA
Cross country - AAA
Field hockey - AAA
Golf - AAA
Gymnastics - AAAA
Soccer - AAA
Softball - AAA
Track and field - AAA
Volleyball - AAA

Middle school sports

Boys
Basketball
Football
Soccer
Track and field
Wrestling 

Girls
Basketball
Field hockey
Soccer
Track and field
Volleyball

According to PIAA directory July 2013

References

School districts in Franklin County, Pennsylvania